New Age Travellers, (not completely synonymous with but otherwise shortened as New Travellers), are people located primarily in the United Kingdom generally espousing New Age beliefs with hippie / Bohemian culture of the 1960s. New Age Travellers were often referred to as crusties and used to travel between free music festivals and fairs prior to crackdown in the 1990s. New Traveller also refers to those who are not traditionally of an ethnic nomadic group but who have chosen to pursue a nomadic lifestyle.

A New Traveller's transport and home may consist of living in a van,  vardo, lorry, bus, car or caravan converted into a mobile home while also making use of an improvised bender tent, tipi or yurt. "New Age" travellers largely originated in 1980s and early 1990s Britain, when they were described as "crusties" because of the association with "encrusted dirt, dirt as a deliberate embrace of grotesquerie, a statement of resistance against society, proof of nomadic hardship."

History

Origins
The movement originated in the free festivals of the 1960s and 1970s such as the Windsor Free Festival, the early Glastonbury Festivals, Elephant Fayres, and the huge Stonehenge Free Festivals in Great Britain. However, there were longstanding precedents for travelling cultures in Great Britain, including travelling pilgrims, itinerant journeymen and traders, as well as Romani groups and others.

Peace convoy

In the UK during the 1980s the travellers' mobile homes—generally old vans, trucks and buses (including double-deckers)—moved in convoys. One group of travellers came to be known as the Peace Convoy after visits to Peace camps associated with the Campaign for Nuclear Disarmament (CND). The movement had faced significant opposition from the British government and from mainstream media, epitomised by the authorities' attempts to prevent the Stonehenge Free Festival, and the resultant Battle of the Beanfield in 1985—resulting in what was, according to the Guardian, one of the largest mass arrests of civilians since at least the Second World War, possibly one of the biggest in English legal history.

In 1986 and later years police again blocked travellers from "taking the Stones" on the Summer Solstice. This led Travellers to spend summers squatting by the hundreds on several sites adjacent to the A303 in Wiltshire.

Later events included the Castlemorton Common Festival, a huge free and unlicensed event which attracted widespread media coverage and prompted government action. Some legal festivals, such as WOMAD, continue to take place in a variety of countries, including the UK.

Outside the UK

Following the crackdowns against aspects of New Age Traveller culture and the free festivals, some ceased travelling altogether and others headed to continental Europe to pursue continuance of the lifestyle.

A North American counterpart to the UK-based New Age Travellers and former free festivals, is the Rainbow Family which was formed around 1970 and which hosts annual Rainbow Gatherings.

Meanwhile, housetruckers in New Zealand have maintained an alternative, "hippie nomad" lifestyle.

References

Films
 Pierre Carles, Volem rien foutre al païs, co-directed with Christophe Coello et Stéphane Goxe, 2006. A French documentary film about various ways of living on very low income, as many travellers do).
 Martin Parry http://www.swindonviewpoint.com/video/outsiders. Documentary on the Beanfield and trials and tribulations of the Peace Convoy/New Age Travellers.
 23 Teknivals, directed by Zena Merton MA, 2006. A five-minute video montage of travellers' life on the road, free festivals and warehouse parties in Europe (Teknivals) and of the wake of a teenage English traveller, Sonny, in England that was attacked by riot police.

Further reading and external links
 O'Brien, Mark and Ashford, Chris.  "'Tribal Groups' in Modern Britain: Legal Theory, Legal Practice and Human Rights" [2002/3] Contemporary Issues in Law Vol 6, Issue 2 180-206
 Gardner, Peter. "Medieval Brigands, Pictures in a Year of the Hippy Convoy" Published 1987 by Redcliffe, Bristol. 
 Colville, Fergus. Timeshift: New Age Travellers BBC Four, August 2005
 Lodge Alan, A gallery of New Age Traveller images, mostly from the 80s and 90s Retrieved 2008-11-04
 Mr. Sharkey, Gypsy Faire "Many of these images [from New Zealand] come courtesy of Chris Fay, previous editor and publisher of Roadhome NZ, a now-ceased publication for road folk."
 Staff, BBC 2003, Inside Out, BBC, 20 January 2003, "After being forced to camp illegally for years, Brighton Council are the first to introduce a legal site for New Age Travellers".
 Worthington, Andy (Jun 2005) The Battle of the Beanfield, Enabler Publications and Training Services, 
 Worthington, Andy (June 2004). Stonehenge: Celebration and Subversion, Alternative Albion, 
 UK Hippy  and Tribal Living  counter-culture community websites.
 A Different Light Youthful travelers in contemporary America: An interview
 

Counterculture
Glastonbury Festival
Modern nomads
Transport culture
Counterculture festivals activists
New Age
Squatting in the United Kingdom